Raman Tsishkou (born 2 December 1994) is a Belarusian professional racing cyclist, who currently rides for UCI Continental team . He rode at the 2015 UCI Track Cycling World Championships.

Major results
2014
 1st  Time trial, National Under–23 Road Championships
2015
 2nd Time trial, National Under–23 Road Championships
 5th Time trial, National Road Championships
2016
 5th Time trial, National Road Championships
2017
National Road Championships
5th Time trial
9th Road race
2018
 7th Time trial, National Road Championships
2020
 7th Time trial, National Road Championships
2021
 1st Grand Prix Gazipaşa

References

External links

1994 births
Living people
Belarusian male cyclists
Cyclists from Minsk
Cyclists at the 2019 European Games
European Games competitors for Belarus